Paragrynex ochreosparsus is a species of beetle in the family Cerambycidae, and the only species in the genus Paragrynex. It was described by Breuning in 1940.

References

Homonoeini
Beetles described in 1940